Fundamental Articles may refer to:

Fundamental articles (theology), a concept in Protestant theology
Fundamental Articles of 1871, proposed constitutional reform in Austria-Hungary concerning Bohemia